Dystopia: Road to Utopia is the sixth Korean extended play by South Korean girl group Dreamcatcher. It was released on January 26, 2021 by Dreamcatcher Company. Dystopia: Road to Utopia features six tracks including the lead single "Odd Eye", and is available in four versions: "D", "A", "R" and "K". Dystopia: Road to Utopia is the third installment of the Dystopia series, following the group's first album Dystopia: The Tree of Language and fifth EP Dystopia: Lose Myself, both released in 2020.

Background and promotion
On January 4, 2021, it was reported that Dreamcatcher had been working on an album that connects the story contained in "Boca", the lead single of their fifth EP Dystopia: Lose Myself.

Commercial performance
On January 30, Dreamcatcher Company revealed that Dystopia: Road to Utopia has sold more than 60,000 copies in just three days (according to the statistics of Hanteo Chart), and the sales on the day of release has surpassed the first week sales of the previous EP, Dystopia: Lose Myself. The EP debuted at number one on the GAON charts, making it the first album of the group to reach the number one position. In its first month, the EP surpassed 90,000 copies sold.

Composition

Songs
The lead single "Odd Eye" is a nu metal with a strong rock sound and hip hop elements. It conveys the story of the EP implicitly, with a deep and strong will to move forward once again towards a true utopia.

Soompi described "Odd Eye" as "a powerful song that mixes rock and hip hop elements. The lower register of a piano was used to give off a holy vibe. In the chorus, the vocal melody overlaps with a distorted guitar sound, creating a more attention-grabbing piece."

Track listing
The following tracklist was adapted from the official released track list image.

Charts

Weekly charts

Year-end charts

Release history

References

2021 EPs
Dreamcatcher (group) albums
Genie Music EPs
Korean-language EPs